The Indira Gandhi Award for Best Debut Film of a Director is one of the National Film Awards presented annually by the Directorate of Film Festivals, the organization set up by Ministry of Information and Broadcasting, India. It is one of several awards presented for feature films and awarded with Golden Lotus (Swarna Kamal).

The award was instituted in 1980, at 28th National Film Awards and awarded annually for films produced in the year across the country, in all Indian languages; Hindi (11 Awards), Bengali and Malayalam (8 Awards each), Tamil (5 Awards), Marathi (3 Awards), Assamese, English and Telugu (2 each), Haryanvi, Jasari, Karbi and Ladakhi (1 Each).

Award includes 'Golden Lotus Award' (Swarna Kamal) and cash prize. Award, sometimes, also be given as Indira Gandhi Award for Best Debut Film of A Director. Following are the award winners over the years:

Winners

References

External links 
 Official Page for Directorate of Film Festivals, India
 National Film Awards Archives
 National Film Awards at IMDb

National Film Awards (India)
Directorial debut film awards
Monuments and memorials to Indira Gandhi